Nicola Marinangeli (born 14 May 2003) is an Italian racing driver who is currently driving in the Formula Regional Asian Championship for Evans GP.

Career

Lower formulae

2018 
Born in Foligno, Marinangeli started his career in 2018 in the Italian F4 Championship for DR Formula. He drove in the final event at Mugello and scored a best finish of 22nd.

2019 
Following that the Italian signed for Xcel Motorsport to drive in the 2019 F4 UAE Championship. However, Marinangeli finished last in the standings, with 37 points and being one of only three drivers not to score a podium throughout the season. He then competed full-time in Italian F4 with Bhai Tech Racing. He scored no points and finished 29th in the drivers' standings.

2020 
In January of 2020 Marinangeli once again competed in the F4 UAE Championship. He won one race and finished fifth in the drivers' standings.

Formula Renault Eurocup 
Marinangeli was signed by Bhaitech Racing to drive in the final season of the Formula Renault Eurocup. Both of his teammates would beat him in the championship, where the Italian only scored one point.

Formula Regional European Championship 

In 2020 Marinangeli made his debut in the Formula Regional European Championship for KIC Motorsport at Imola. In the five races he competed in the Italian scored six points, leading to him finishing 17th and last in the drivers' championship.

He joined Arden Motorsport for the 2021 season, partnering Alex Quinn and William Alatalo. Despite regular finishes in the top twenty Marinangeli was unable to reach the points once during the season, leading to 30th place in the standings at the end of the campaign.

FIA Formula 3 Championship 
Marinangeli tested for Charouz Racing System on the final two days of the FIA Formula 3 post-season test in November of 2021.

Euroformula Open Championship 
In February 2022 Marinangeli was announced by Dutch team Van Amersfoort Racing as one of their drivers for the upcoming EuroFormula Open season.

Racing record

Career summary 

* Season still in progress.

Complete Italian F4 Championship results
(key) (Races in bold indicate pole position) (Races in italics indicate fastest lap)

Complete Formula 4 UAE Championship results 
(key) (Races in bold indicate pole position; races in italics indicate fastest lap)

Complete Formula Renault Eurocup results 
(key) (Races in bold indicate pole position) (Races in italics indicate fastest lap)

Complete Formula Regional European Championship results 
(key) (Races in bold indicate pole position) (Races in italics indicate fastest lap)

Complete Formula Regional Asian Championship results
(key) (Races in bold indicate pole position) (Races in italics indicate the fastest lap of top ten finishers)

Complete Euroformula Open Championship results 
(key) (Races in bold indicate pole position; races in italics indicate points for the fastest lap of top ten finishers)

References

External links 
 

2003 births
Living people
People from Foligno
Italian racing drivers
Italian F4 Championship drivers
Formula Renault Eurocup drivers
Formula Regional Asian Championship drivers
Formula Regional European Championship drivers
F3 Asian Championship drivers
Sportspeople from the Province of Perugia
Arden International drivers
Van Amersfoort Racing drivers
Bhaitech drivers
Euroformula Open Championship drivers
KIC Motorsport drivers
Monolite Racing drivers
UAE F4 Championship drivers
Ferrari Challenge drivers